A prison island is an island housing a prison. Islands have often been used as sites of prisons throughout history due to their natural isolation preventing escape.

Prison islands by country

Australia

Christmas Island, location of Christmas Island Detention Centre which houses people who are seeking asylum in Australia during processing.

Bulgaria
 St. Anastasia Island, used as a prison island for political prisoners between 1925 and 1940

Channel Islands
Alderney, 1940–1945, four camps built during the German occupation of the Channel Islands: two camps of "voluntter" workers (Lager Borkum, Lager Norderney) and two subcamps of Neuengamme concentration camp (Lager Helgoland, Lager Sylt).  European forced labourers were made to build fortifications on the island.

China
 Dongguan Prison occupies most of Xinzhou, an island in the East River

Croatia
Goli otok, location of the prison and torture camp for political dissidents in SFR Yugoslavia, from 1949 to 1988

France

Île Royale, 1852-1952, part of the Devil's Island penal colony
Devil's Island (Kourou), 1852-1952, part of the Devil's Island penal colony
Saint-Joseph Island, 1852-1952, part of the Devil's Island penal colony
Île Sainte-Marguerite, 1600s-1900s.
Île d'Yeu, 1945–1951, used to imprison Philippe Pétain, collaborationist leader of Vichy France.
Château d'If, 17th century–1890, famous as a setting for The Count of Monte Cristo
Frioul island

Hong Kong
 Tai A Chau
 Tai A Chau Detention Centre, 1991–96
 Hei Ling Chau
 Hei Ling Chau Addiction Treatment Centre, 1975–present
 Hei Ling Chau Correctional Institution, 1994–present
 Lai Sun Correctional Institution, 1984–present
 Nei Kwu Correctional Institution, 2002–present

Indonesia
Nusa Kambangan off the southern coast of Java is a notorious prison island, and contains a number of prisons.

Isle of Man
Hutchinson Internment Camp, 1940–1945, in the southeast of the Isle of Man. Held Austrian and German internees until 1944, when it became a POW camp.

Malaysia

Jerejak Island, location of the Jerejak Rehabilitation Centre from 1969 to 1993. Called the 'Alcatraz of Malaysia'.

Montenegro

Grmožur, a fortified islet in Lake Skadar which served as a prison
Mamula, location of the Fascist Italian concentration camp, from 1942 to 1945

Namibia
Shark Island concentration camp, 1905–1907, used during the Herero and Namaqua genocide

Russia

Ognenny Ostrov, location of Vologodskiy Pyatak prison since 1917.

South Africa

Robben Island, location of Robben Island Prison from 1961 to 1996. The Island was used to incarcerate political prisoners as early as the 17th Century, and later during the Xhosa Wars

Tanzania

Changuu, known as 'Prison Island'. Held rebellious slaves in 1860s.

Turkey

İmralı island, location of a prison since 1935.

United Kingdom/Republic of Ireland

Inishbofin: the star fort on the island was used as a prison for Catholic priests during the Cromwellian invasion of Ireland
Spike Island, County Cork, from 1847 to 2004. Part of Treaty Ports.

United States

Alcatraz Island, location of Alcatraz Federal Penitentiary from 1934 until 1963.
Rikers Island, location of New York City's main jail complex.
Deer Island (Massachusetts), location of Deer Island Prison, closed in 1991.
McNeil Island, location of McNeil Island Corrections Center from 1875 to 2011.
Diego Garcia, believed to be a CIA black site circa 2005.
Terminal Island, a low security federal prison.

References